Muru-Astráin is a locality and council located in the municipality of Cizur, in Navarre province, Spain, Spain. As of 2020, it has a population of 75.

Geography 
Muru-Astráin is located 12km southwest of Pamplona.

References

Populated places in Navarre